R-Kal K-Quan Truluck (September 30, 1974 – November 29, 2019) was an American professional football player. Truluck died on November 29, 2019, due to complications from ALS and cancer.

Early life
Truluck attended Spring Valley High School, where he lettered in football three times and was an all-state and all-county linebacker in his senior year. He spent his high school years growing up at the Lakeside Family & Children's Center in Rockland County, New York, a group foster home that he still visited in the offseason.

College career
Truluck attended SUNY-Cortland, where he played in 35 career games with 27 starts. He recorded 238 tackles, 121 solo tackles, 21 sacks, two forced fumbles, two fumble recoveries and seven passes defensed.

As sophomore, Truluck had a successful season in which he recorded 64 tackles, six sacks, seven tackles-for-losses and two blocked field goal attempts in 10 games as a defensive end. Coaches thought to use more of his athletic ability so they changed his position to outside linebacker. As a junior, he started 10 games at outside linebacker and recorded 105 tackles, 6.5 sacks, five tackles-for-losses and two blocked field goal attempts. He was a Division III All-America second-team selection and named an ECAC Upstate New York All-Star. As a senior, he recorded 64 tackles, nine sacks, three tackles for loss and four blocked field goal attempts while earning second-team All-East honors. He was also named an ECAC Upstate New York All-Star in addition to being named team MVP by his teammates and coaches. Truluck graduated with a degree in health sciences.

Professional career
After playing at Division III SUNY-Cortland, Truluck was signed as an undrafted free agent by the Washington Redskins of the National Football League. He signed on to the team's practice squad but was released in October 1997. In April 1998, he signed with the Saskatchewan Roughriders of the Canadian Football League, where he played from 1998 until 2000. In his rookie year there, Truluck recorded nine tackles and three sacks, winning the Defensive Player of the Week award for his debut. His season was cut short after four games due to post-concussion syndrome. Truluck signed with the AFL's Detroit Fury, where he played from 2001 to 2002. In 2001 Truluck amassed 8.0 sacks and becoming the "Rookie of the Year," following that season in 2002 Truluck became Arena Football's "Lineman of the Year" with 9.5 sacks. Truluck became well known for his speed and quickness, scouts began to make comparisons of Truluck's ability to Derrick Thomas. This landed Truluck a return to the NFL to play with the Kansas City Chiefs (2002–2004). In fourteen games of the 2003 season, Truluck recorded 17 tackles and six sacks. He was traded to the Green Bay Packers for a fifth- and a sixth-round draft choice during the 2004 preseason. Over the course of the season, he played in 10 games, recording 12 tackles and 2.5 sacks. He was released by the Packers and signed with the Arizona Cardinals before the 2005 season. In 10 games with the Cardinals, he recorded three tackles before returning to the CFL for the 2006-2007 seasons, which he spent with the Montreal Alouettes. In 2008 Truluck returned to the Arena Football league through a dispersal draft, being selected by the Georgia Force, during that season he amassed 30 tackles and 5.5 sacks. Truluck hosted his own live internet show with VoiceAmerica Sports, called "Inside the Trenches in Arizona". Truluck returned to football with Orlando Predators of the Arena Football League for the 2013 season.

Death
On November 29, 2019, Truluck died from Lou Gehrig's Disease.

References

External links
http://www.arenafootball.com/sports/a-footbl/aflprd/mtt/truluck_rkal00.html 
http://www.arenafootball.com/sports/a-footbl/aflprd/mtt/truluck_rkal00.html
http://www.washingtontimes.com/news/2002/aug/31/20020831-041737-1784r/
R-Kal Truluck NFL Football Statistics - Pro-Football-Reference.com

1974 births
2019 deaths
Sportspeople from Brooklyn
Players of American football from New York City
Players of American football from New York (state)
American football defensive ends
American players of Canadian football
Cortland Red Dragons football players
Neurological disease deaths in Florida
Deaths from motor neuron disease
Washington Redskins players
Canadian football defensive linemen
Saskatchewan Roughriders players
Detroit Fury players
Kansas City Chiefs players
Green Bay Packers players
Arizona Cardinals players
Montreal Alouettes players
Georgia Force players
Orlando Predators players
St. Louis Rams players
Deaths from cancer in Florida